The Czechoslovak Athletics Championships was an annual outdoor track and field competition organised by the Czechoslovakia Athletics Association, which served as the national championship for the sport in Czechoslovakia.

Typically organised in July or August, the event was first held in 1919 (the first summer after the country's formation) until 1992. The competition was not held in the years from 1938 to 1944 due to World War II and ran for 66 editions in total. It was superseded by the Czech Athletics Championships and Slovak Athletics Championships following the country's dissolution in 1993. Czechoslovakia had sometimes hosted separate Czech and Slovak sub-national championships before then.

The Czechoslovak Indoor Athletics Championships was later introduced in 1969 to complement the summer outdoor event with a spring one.

Events
By its final year, the competition programme featured a total of 35 individual Czechoslovak Championship athletics events, 19 for men and 16 for women. For men, there were seven track running events, three obstacle events, four jumps, four throws, and the decathlon. Women did not have pole vault, hammer throw or 3000 metres steeplechase championship contests.

Track running
100 metres, 200 metres, 400 metres, 800 metres, 1500 metres, 3000 metres (women only), 5000 metres (men only), 10,000 metres
Obstacle events
100 metres hurdles (women only), 110 metres hurdles (men only), 400 metres hurdles, 3000 metres steeplechase (men only)
Jumping events
Pole vault (men only), high jump, long jump, triple jump
Throwing events
Shot put, discus throw, javelin throw, hammer throw (men only)
Combined events
Decathlon (men only), heptathlon (women only)

Men competed in a 200 metres hurdles until 1967, by which point the event had fallen out of favour in international competitions. The women's programme was gradually expanded from the 1960s onwards, with the 1500 m appearing in 1969, the 3000 m in 1972, the 10,000 m in 1984, and the triple jump in 1990. The women's hurdles events gradually changed too: the 80 metres hurdles became the 100 m version in 1968, a 200 m version was held from 1970 to 1972, then the women's 400 m hurdles began in 1975. The women's combined event was the athletics pentathlon up to 1980.

Separate championship events were held for road running and walks, and cross country running.

Editions

References

Athletics competitions in Czechoslovakia
Athletics
National athletics competitions
Recurring sporting events established in 1919
Recurring sporting events disestablished in 1992
Summer events in Czechoslovakia
Defunct athletics competitions